Cannabicitran (CBTC) is a phytocannabinoid first isolated in 1974 as a trace component of Cannabis sativa, Structurally related compounds can be found in some other plants. It is not psychoactive, but was found to reduce intraocular pressure in tests on rabbits, which may reflect agonist activity at the NAGly receptor (formally GPR18) that is known to be a target of many structurally related cannabinoids.

See also 
 9-OH-HHC
 Cannabichromene
 Cannabicyclol
 Cannabidiol dimethyl ether
 Cannabielsoin
 Cannabigerol
 Cannabimovone
 Cannabitriol

References 

Benzochromenes
Phytocannabinoids
Heterocyclic compounds with 4 rings
Oxygen heterocycles